Parkdale Mall is a mall located in Beaumont, Texas that opened in 1973. The owner of Parkdale Mall is CBL & Associates Properties, Inc. The mall's anchor stores include a Dick's Sporting Goods and Field & Stream combo Store, Dillard's, Five Below, Forever 21 (known as XXI), HomeGoods, JCPenney, and Stage. Another anchor, Macy's, closed in March 2017. The former Macy's became a combination between the Dick's Sporting Goods and Field & Stream combo store, HomeGoods, and Five Below. KBTV-TV, the Beaumont-Port Arthur Fox affiliate, used to broadcast inside the mall, but now broadcasts at the KFDM studios. In addition, a Tilt Studio location opened in early 2017. The eighth anchor was Sears which closed on February 2, 2020. Stage shut down in 2020 when the chain went out of business.

History
Parkdale Mall opened in 1973, with only three anchors: JCPenney, Joske's, and Montgomery Ward. In the mid-1980s, a new wing was added, along with the fourth anchor Sears. In 1987, Joske's rebranded as Dillard's. In 2001, Montgomery Ward closed its doors, and was replaced with a new Foley's store in 2002, which later became Macy's in 2006.

Notes

References

See also
 current Parkdale Mall website
 archive of older Parkdale Mall website
 CBL Properties - Portfolio - Parkdale Mall

Shopping malls established in 1973
Shopping malls in Texas
CBL Properties
Buildings and structures in Beaumont, Texas
1973 establishments in Texas